Kevin Clements is an Emeritus Professor of Peace and Conflict Studies at the University of Otago, New Zealand. He was formerly Professor of Peace and Conflict Studies and Foundation Director of  the Australian Centre for Peace and Conflict Studies (ACPACS) at the University of Queensland. He has also been Secretary General of the International Peace Research Association since January 2009. Since 2016 he was appointed Director of the Toda Peace Institute , Tokyo, Japan.

Other positions
Director of the Toda Peace Institute , Tokyo Japan .
Visiting Professor, Centre for the Analysis and Resolution of Conflict, University of Kent at Canterbury and Visiting Professor, PRIME, Meiji Gakuin University, Tokyo Japan 2015-2016
 Secretary General of International Alert  
Board of the European Centre for Conflict Prevention and  President of the European Peacebuilding Liaison Office in Brussels.
 Vernon and Minnie Lynch Chair of Conflict Resolution at the Institute for Conflict Analysis and Resolution at George Mason University, USA 1994-2000, and   Director of the Institute from 1994-1999.
Director of the Quaker United Nations Office in Geneva and 
Head of the Peace Research Centre at the Australian National University in Canberra .  
visiting or permanent academic positions at the Institute of Commonwealth Studies, Oxford, the University of Hong Kong,  the University of Canterbury, the Institute of Southeast Asian Studies at the National University of Singapore, the University of East Anglia, and the University of Colorado Boulder. 
President of the International Peace Research Association IPRA 1994-1998, 
President of the IPRA Foundation from 1995-2000
Secretary General  of the Asia-Pacific Peace Research Association (APPRA).

Clements has been a consultant to numerous organisations, and advisor to the  New Zealand, Australian, British, Swedish and Dutch governments. He was a member  of the New Zealand Government’s Defence Committee of Enquiry  in 1985

Publications
He has written or edited  10 books and over 190 chapters /articles
e.g 
Clements, K. P., & Ikeda, D. (2019). Toward a century of peace: A dialogue on the role of civil society in peacebuilding. Abingdon, UK: Routledge.
Clements, K. P. (Ed.). (2017). Identity, trust, and reconciliation in East Asia: Dealing with painful history to create a peaceful present. Cham, Switzerland: Palgrave Macmillan.
Clements, K. P., & Urbain, O. (Eds.). (2013). Risk and uncertainty: Understanding and dialogue in the 21st century. New Brunswick, NJ: Transaction.
Clements, K. P., & Mizner, N. (eds) (2007) The Centre Holds:Reform of the United Nations in the 21st Century. New Jersey, Transaction Publishers.
Clements, K. P, (1997) Teori Pembangunan:dari kiri ke kanan (From Right to Left in Development Theory), Jogjakarta, Pustaka Pelajar.
Clements, K. P., & Wards, R. (eds.) (1994) Building International Community: Cooperating for Peace: Case Studies. Sydney Allen and Unwin Ltd.
Clements, K. P. & Wilson, C. (eds) (1994) UN Peacekeeping at the Cross Roads. Canberra: ANU  Peace Research Centre.
Clements, K. P. (Ed.) (1993) Peace and Security in the Asia Pacific Region:Post Cold War Problems and Prospects. Tokyo, United Nations University Press.
Boulding, E., Brigagao, C., & Clements, K. (Eds.) (1990) Peace, Culture and Society: Transnational Research and Dialogue. Boulder: Westview Press.
Clements, K. P. (1988) Back from the Brink:  The Creation of a Nuclear Free New Zealand, Wellington & London: Allen and Unwin.

References

External links

Australian Centre for Peace and Conflict Studies
Personal profile at National Centre for Peace and Conflict Studies, University of Otago

Living people
Academic staff of the University of Queensland
Australian social scientists
Academics of the University of East Anglia
Academic staff of the University of Otago
Year of birth missing (living people)
New Zealand Quakers